Fine Wine is a studio album by American country singer-songwriter Bill Anderson. It was released on August 25, 1998 via Warner Bros. Records. It was co-produced by Caryn and Steve Wariner. Fine Wine was Anderson's 36th studio album as a recording artist and his first major-label release since the 1980s. The project consisted of 11 tracks that received mixed reception from music journalists and writers.

Background and content
In 1998, Anderson was signed to Warner Bros. Records as part of a veterans artists project. Other performers were also signed to the roster in hopes of restarting their music careers. This included performers Ronnie Milsap, Connie Smith and Don Williams. "I definitely thing there's a segment of the country music audience that's not being sung too. Hopefully this will help fill a little bit of that void," Anderson commented in 1998. The major-label project was recorded at Sound Emporium, a studio located in Nashville, Tennessee. The project was produced by country artist Steve Wariner, along with his wife, Caryn Wariner. Anderson was inspired to work with Wariner based on his reworking of Anderson's "The Tip of My Fingers". "...it was a wake-up call," he recalled in 1998.

Fine Wine consisted of 11 tracks, all of which were composed (or co-composed) by Anderson himself. The project included a re-recording of Anderson's hit "The Tip of My Fingers". Instead of being a solo cut, the song featured vocals from the other country artists who had hit versions of the song themselves. The artists included on the track were Eddy Arnold, Roy Clark, Jean Shepard and Wariner. Other tracks range from ballads to novelty numbers. One novelty tune included was the track "My Van", which was written with Gary Nicholson and Steve Wariner.

Release and reception
Fine Wine was released on August 25, 1998 via Warner Bros. Records. It was Anderson's 36th studio album released in his recording career. Upon its release, the project did not make any appearances on the Billboard album surveys, including the Top Country Albums chart. Deborah Evans Price of Billboard positively reviewed the album. In her review, Price compared Anderson's career and album in comparison to the album's title: "Fine Wine".

John Weisberger of Country Standard Time also gave the album a positive reception. He called the collection a set of "vintage Anderson creations", highlighting several of the album's tracks for its wide array of musical styles. Weisberger also was pleased to Anderson recording new music again. "It's a rare song that can chart in three different decades, but that's the kind of writer – and singer – Anderson is. It's good to have him back in the studio again," he said.

Track listings

CD and digital versions

Personnel
All credits are adapted from Allmusic and the liner notes of Fine Wine.

Musical personnel

 Bill Anderson – lead vocals, liner notes
 Eddy Arnold – guest vocals
 Danny Bailey – background vocals
 Lea Jane Berinati – background vocals
 Clint Black – guest vocals, harmonica
 Roy Clark – guest vocals
 Jana King Evans – background vocals
 Gregg Galbraith – acoustic guitar
 Ron Gannaway – drums
 Sonny Garrish – dobro, steel guitar
 Randy Goodrum – keyboards
 Carl Jackson – acoustic guitar

 John Jarvis – piano
 Mike Johnson – steel guitar
 Woody Lingle – bass
 Jimmy Nails – slide guitar
 Jon Randall – background vocals
 Hargus "Pig" Robbins – piano
 Gail Rudisill Johnson – fiddle
 Jean Shepard – guest vocals
 Lisa Silver – background vocals
 Gary W. Smith – keyboards, piano
 Steve Wariner – background vocals, acoustic guitar, electric guitar
 Andrea Zonn – background vocals

Technical personnel
 Randy Gardner – engineering
 Jim McGuire – photography
 Denny Purcell – mastering
 Cheryl Riddle – hairstylist, make-up
 Garrett Rittenberry – art direction, design
 Caryn Wariner – producer
 Steve Wariner – producer

Release history

References

1998 albums
Bill Anderson (singer) albums
Warner Records albums